Öwezgeldi Ataýew (born 1951) is a Turkmen politician. He was the chairman of the Assembly of Turkmenistan from 2002 to 2006. According to the Constitution of Turkmenistan, he was to become the acting president after the death of Saparmurat Niyazov in December 2006. However, the State Security Council of Turkmenistan reported that Atayev was not appointed acting president due to a criminal case started against him. Atayev was charged with abuse of power and human rights violations.

Gurbanguly Berdimuhamedow, who was Deputy Prime Minister and Minister of Health, succeeded Niyazov instead. According to Kommersant, Atayev was put under arrest on 21 December 2006. Berdimuhamedow signed an order dismissing Atayev for "committing a deed incompatible with the high position entrusted to him". Atayev was accused in a statement of harassing and humiliating his daughter-in-law and driving her to attempted suicide.

References

1951 births
People from Ashgabat
Chairmen of the Assembly of Turkmenistan
Living people
Turkmenistan prisoners and detainees
Prisoners and detainees of Turkmenistan